State Route 377, also known as SR 377, is a state highway in northeast Arizona traveling from northeast to southwest; it begins at a junction with State Route 77 south of Holbrook, goes past Dry Lake, to end at State Route 277 east of Heber-Overgaard.  Parts of the highway are also known as Dry Lake Road and Heber Road.

Route description
SR 377 is a  highway in eastern Arizona.  The southern terminus of the highway is located at an intersection with SR 277 northeast of Heber.  It heads northeast from this intersection and keeps this general heading for its entire route.  It reaches its northern terminus at an intersection with SR 77 south of Holbrook.

History 
State Route 377 was defined by the Arizona Department of Transportation in 1971 exactly the way it is now. The designation ran from SR 277 to SR 77. Since then, the road has not undergone any major realignments.

Junction list

References

External links

SR 377 at Arizona Roads

377
Transportation in Navajo County, Arizona